Górak is a Polish surname. Notable people with the surname include:

 Andrzej Górak (born 1951), Polish engineer
 Daniel Górak (born 1983), Polish table tennis player
  (born 1959), Polish athlete

See also
 
 Gorak (disambiguation)

Polish-language surnames